ǃKweiten-ta-ǁKen (name derived from an unknown language local to the Katkop Mountains) (also known as Rachel or Griet) was a noted ǀXam (San) chronicler of ǀXam culture and knowledge. She played an important role in contributing to the Bleek and Lloyd archive of “Specimens of Bushman Folklore” providing a female perspective on the life, rituals, and beliefs of |Xam society. She was the primary source on ǀxam folklore, customs, and coming-of-age rites. She travelled to the Cape in June 1874 with her family and stayed until January 1875 during which she was interviewed by Wilhelm Bleek and Lucy Lloyd. She was from the Katkop mountains north west of Brandvlei in what is today South Africa.

References

External links
Bleek and Lloyd Archive online
 authors: !kweiten ta ||ken (Rachel) (VI)

Women in Red 2020
San people
19th-century South African people
19th-century South African women
South African folklore